Clausen Glacier is a narrow glacier draining northward from the summit of Mount Takahe in Marie Byrd Land. The terminus of the glacier is just west of Knezevich Rock. It was mapped by the United States Geological Survey from surveys and from U.S. Navy aerial photos, 1959–66, and named by the Advisory Committee on Antarctic Names for Henrik B. Clausen of the University of Bern, Switzerland, United States Antarctic Research Program glaciologist at Byrd Station, 1969–70.

References
 

Glaciers of Marie Byrd Land